Oxyntas was a son of the Numidian King Jugurtha.

He walked with his brother Iampsas in the Roman Gaius Marius's triumphal parade of 104 BC. His father died soon afterward, but Oxyntas was sent to the town of Venusia, in the Southern Italian region of Basilicata, where he remained until 89 BC. In the Marsic War, Gaius Papius Mutilus used Oxyntas to inspire defections among the Numidian troops serving under the Roman general Sextus Julius Caesar (Appian, Civil Wars, 1.42). It is not known what happened to Oxyntas after the Marsic War (91–88 BC).

See also
List of Kings of Numidia

1st-century BC Berber people
2nd-century BC Berber people
Kingdom of Numidia
Ancient African people
Roman-era inhabitants of Italy